Irving Glassberg, A.S.C. (19 October 1906 – 9 September 1958) was a Polish-American cinematographer, who worked on many Universal Pictures during the forties and fifties. Glassberg, along with Arthur Lubin was responsible for getting Clint Eastwood into the movies.

Partial filmography

References

Bibliography

External links

1906 births
1958 deaths
Polish cinematographers
Polish emigrants to the United States
American people of Polish-Jewish descent